The men's division of the 2021 PNVF Champions League was held from November 29 to December 4, 2021. This is the inaugural edition of the PNVF Champions League. The winner of this tournament will be the country’s representative to the Asian Men’s Club Volleyball Championships in May next year.

Participating teams
Seven teams entered the 2021 PNVF Champions League. Four teams (Basilan, MRT-Negros, Sabong International, and Team Dasma) are provincial teams.

Format
The participating teams were drawn into two groups for the preliminary round which uses a single round robin format. The top two teams will advance to the semifinals.

Preliminary round
All times are Philippine Standard Time (UTC+08:00).

Pool A

|}

|}

Pool B

|}

|}

Final round
All times are Philippine Standard Time (UTC+08:00).

5th–7th places

5th place match

|}

Final four

Semifinals

|}

3rd place match

|}

Final

|}

Final standing

Awards

Most Valuable Player
 Mark Calado (Team Dasma Monarchs)
Best Setter
 Kris Silang (Team Dasma Monarchs)
Best Outside Spikers
 Mark Calado (Team Dasma Monarchs)
 Mark Alfafara (Go for Gold-Air Force Aguilas)

Best Middle Blockers
 Jayvee Sumagaysay (Team Dasma Monarchs)
 Rwenzmel Taguibolos (Manileño Spikers)
Best Opposite Spiker
 John Vic De Guzman (Go for Gold-Air Force Aguilas)
Best Libero
 Ricky Marcos (Go for Gold-Air Force Aguilas)

Source: Tiebreaker Times

See also
2021 PNVF Champions League for Women

References

2021 in Philippine sport
PNVF Champions League